Maclean House may refer to

Academic Facilities
 the John Maclean House, formerly the President's House at Princeton University
 A dorm at the University of Chicago